Le Grand Charles is a 2006 French television miniseries on the life of Charles de Gaulle from 1939 to 1959, written and directed by Bernard Stora.

Plot

Cast

 Bernard Farcy as Charles de Gaulle
 Danièle Lebrun as Yvonne de Gaulle
 David Ryall as Winston Churchill 
 Pascal Elso as Gaston Palewski
 Hubert Saint-Macary as Michel Debré
 Denis Podalydès as Claude Mauriac
 Bernard Alane as Paul Ramadier
 Nicolas Vaude as Paul Baudoin
 Bernard Bloch as Jacques Foccart
 Patrick Chesnais as Henri Giraud
 Julien Boisselier as Jacques Chaban-Delmas
 Thierry Hancisse as Olivier Guichard
 Jacques Spiesser as Pierre Pflimlin
 Robert Hardy as Franklin D. Roosevelt
 Sam Spiegel as Gilbert Renault
 Jean Dell as Pierre Billotte
 Grégoire Oestermann as André Malraux
 Scali Delpeyrat as Jacques Baumel
 Pierre-François Dumeniaud as Jacques Soustelle
 Gérard Lartigau as Paul Reynaud
 Jean-Michel Molé as Vincent Auriol
 Gilles David as André Philip 
 Stéphane Boucher as Maurice Thorez
 Olivier Granier as Jean Monnet
 Jean-Claude Durand as Raoul Salan
 Denis Bénoliel as René Pleven
 Gérard Chaillou as Charles Corbin
 Célia Desbrus as Anne de Gaulle
 Paul de Launoy as Philippe de Gaulle
 Réginald Huguenin as Jules Moch
 Daniel Kenigsberg as Alphonse Juin
 Patrice Bornand as Michel Poniatowski
 Patrick Zard as Alain de Boissieu
 Paul Aham as Christian Fouchet
 Grégori Derangère as Claude Guy
 Jean-Yves Berteloot as Léon Delbecque
 Jay Benedict as Wilbur
 Hugh Fraser as McMillan
 Dominic Gould as Roosevelt interpreter
 Nicolas Briançon as Paul de Villelume
 Chantal Banlier as Augustine 
 Marc Berman as Margerie
 Rémy Carpentier as Flohic
 Sébastien Cotterot as Courcel
 Jean-Yves Chatelais as Delvaux
 Marie Mergey as Mademoiselle Potel
 Olivier Claverie as Gaston de Bonneval
 Jean-Pierre Durand as Linarès
 Vladislav Galard as Guy Monnerot
 Lise Lamétrie as Philomène Zieger
 Pierre Stévenin as Ernest Buffard

Accolades

External links

2006 television films
2006 films
French television films
Films set in the 1930s
Films set in the 1940s
Films set in the 1950s
Television series set in the 1930s
Television series set in the 1940s
Television series set in the 1950s
Films set in France
French World War II films
Films shot in France
Cultural depictions of Charles de Gaulle
Cultural depictions of Winston Churchill
Cultural depictions of Franklin D. Roosevelt
2000s French television miniseries
World War II television series
2000s French films